Ammonium carbamate is a chemical compound with the formula  consisting of ammonium cation  and carbamate anion . It is a white solid that is extremely soluble in water, less so in alcohol. Ammonium carbamate can be formed by the reaction of ammonia  with carbon dioxide , and will slowly decompose to those gases at ordinary temperatures and pressures. It is an intermediate in the industrial synthesis of urea , an important fertilizer.

Properties

Solid-gas equilibrium
In a closed container solid ammonium carbamate is in equilibrium with carbon dioxide and ammonia 

Lower temperatures shift the equilibrium towards the carbamate.

At higher temperatures ammonium carbamate condenses into urea:

This reaction was first discovered in 1870 by Bassarov, by heating ammonium carbamate in sealed glass tubes at temperatures ranging from 130 to 140 °C.

Equilibrium in water
At ordinary temperatures and pressures, ammonium carbamate exists in aqueous solutions as an equilibrium with ammonia and carbon dioxide, and the anions bicarbonate, and carbonate, . Indeed, solutions of ammonium carbonate or bicarbonate will contain some carbamate anions too.

Structure
The structure of solid ammonium carbamate has been confirmed by X-ray crystallography. The oxygen centers form hydrogen bonds to the ammonium cation. There are two polymorphs, α and β, both in the orthorhombic crystal system but differing in their space group. The α polymorph is in space group Pbca (no. 61), whereas the β polymorph is in Ibam (no. 72). The α polymorph is more volatile.

Natural occurrence
Ammonium carbamate serves a key role in the formation of carbamoyl phosphate, which is necessary for both the urea cycle and the production of pyrimidines. In this enzyme-catalyzed reaction, ATP and ammonium carbamate are converted to ADP and carbamoyl phosphate:

Preparation

From liquid ammonia and dry ice
Ammonium carbamate is prepared by the direct reaction between liquid ammonia and dry ice (solid carbon dioxide):

It is also prepared by reaction of the two gases at high temperature (450–500 K) and high pressure (150–250 bar).

From gaseous ammonia and carbon dioxide
The absence of water prevents the formation of bicarbonate and carbonate, and no ammonia is lost.

Uses

Urea synthesis
Ammonium carbamate is an intermediate in the industrial production of urea.
A typical industrial plant that makes urea can produce up to 4000 tons a day. 
in this reactor and can then be dehydrated to urea according to the following equation:

Pesticide formulations
Ammonium carbamate has also been approved by the Environmental Protection Agency as an inert ingredient present in aluminium phosphide pesticide formulations. This pesticide is commonly used for insect and rodent control in areas where agricultural products are stored. The reason for ammonium carbamate as an ingredient is to make the phosphine less flammable by freeing ammonia and carbon dioxide to dilute hydrogen phosphine formed by a hydrolysis reaction.

Laboratory
Ammonium carbamate can be used as a good ammoniating agent, though not nearly as strong as ammonia itself. For instance, it is an effective reagent for preparation of different substituted β-amino-α,β-unsaturated esters. The reaction can be carried out in methanol at room temperature and can be isolated in the absence of water, in high purity and yield.

Preparation of metal carbamates
Ammonium carbamate can be a starting reagent for the production of salts of other cations. For instance, by reacting it with solid potassium chloride KCl in liquid ammonia one can obtain potassium carbamate . Carbamates of other metals, such as calcium, can be produced by reacting ammonium carbamate with a suitable salt of the desired cation, in an anhydrous solvent such as methanol, ethanol, or formamide, even at room temperature.

References

Carbamates
Ammonium compounds